Kuhenjan (also Romanized as Koohenjan, Kūhenjān and Kūhanjān; also known as Kūh-e Īnjūn and Kūhinjūn) is a city & capital of, Kuhenjan District, Kuhenjan Rural District, Sarvestan County, Fars Province, Iran. At the 2006 census, its population was 2,930, in 750 families.

References 

Populated places in Sarvestan County
Cities in Fars Province